Jitendra Chaudhury (born 27 June 1958) is an Indian communist politician who is a member of the Communist Party of India (Marxist) and serving as the incumbent MLA from Sabroom. Previously, he had won the 2014 Indian general elections from the Tripura East (Lok Sabha constituency) before conceding defeat against Rebati Tripura of BJP in 2019.

Jitendra Choudhury is the current State General Secretary of Communist Party of India (Marxist). At the 22nd Communist Party Congress in 2018, he was elected as a member of the central committee. He is current president of GMP, the Indigenous Tripuri wing of the party. He is also joint secretary of AIKS, the peasant's wing of the party. He is the national convener of Adivasi Adhikar Rashtriya Manch (AARM).

Political career

In 1993, Choudhury was elected from Manu ST constituency as CPI(M) candidate for Tripura Legislative Assembly election and he won the election. He was the Minister of Forest and Industry, Commerce, Sports from 1993 to 1998 in Dasarath Deb Ministry. He was also Minister of Forest and Industry, Commerce, Sports in Manik Sarkar Ministry from 1998 to 2014. In 2014 Indian general election he won from Tripura East (Lok Sabha constituency) and became Member of the 16th Lok Sabha from Tripura. However in the 2019 Indian general election, he lost to Rebati Tripura. In the 2023 Tripura election, he won from the constituency of Sabroom.

See also
 Aghore Debbarma
 Radhacharan Debbarma
 Rebati Tripura
 Reang

References

External links

 CPI(M) Tripura State Committee
 CPI(M) Central Committee

Living people
India MPs 2014–2019
Communist Party of India (Marxist) politicians from Tripura
Tripura politicians
1958 births
Lok Sabha members from Tripura
Tripura MLAs 2023–2028